Favorite Island is an island in Western Australia.

A population of 133 Lancelin Island skinks were introduced onto the island in 2002 by the Department of Environment and Conservation as part of a breeding program.

See also
 List of islands of Western Australia

References

Islands of the Mid West (Western Australia)
Nature reserves in Western Australia
Turquoise Coast (Western Australia)